Andrew W. Bey (born October 28, 1939) is an American jazz singer and pianist. Bey has a wide vocal range, with a four-octave baritone voice.

Raised in Newark, New Jersey, Bey attended Newark Arts High School.

Career
He worked on the 1959/1960 television show Startime with Connie Francis, and sang for Louis Jordan. At age 17, he formed a trio with his siblings Salome Bey and Geraldine Bey (de Haas) called Andy and the Bey Sisters. The trio went on a 16-month tour of Europe. The jazz trumpeter Chet Baker's 1988 documentary Let's Get Lost includes footage of Bey and his sisters delighting a Parisian audience. The trio recorded three albums (one for RCA Victor in 1961 and two for Prestige in 1964 and 1965) before breaking up in 1967. Bey also worked with Horace Silver and Gary Bartz.

In 1973, Bey and Dee Dee Bridgewater were the featured vocalists on Stanley Clarke's album Children of Forever. Later, Bey recorded the album Experience and Judgment (1974), which was influenced by Indian music. He then returned to hard bop, and recorded covers of music by non-jazz musicians, such as Nick Drake.

In 1976, Bey performed in a theatre production of Adrienne Kennedy's A Rat's Mass directed by Cecil Taylor at La MaMa Experimental Theatre Club in the East Village of Manhattan. Musicians Rashid Bakr, Jimmy Lyons, Karen Borca, David S. Ware, and Raphe Malik also performed in the production. Taylor's production combined the original script with a chorus of orchestrated voices used as instruments.

Bey's other albums include Ballads, Blues & Bey (1996), Tuesdays in Chinatown (2001), American Song (2004) and Ain't Necessarily So (2007). He received the "2003 Jazz Vocalist of the Year" award by the Jazz Journalists Association. His album American Song received a Grammy nomination for Best Jazz Vocal Album in 2005.

Bey is openly gay. In 1994, he was diagnosed as HIV-positive, but has continued his career, maintaining a lifestyle that includes yoga and a vegetarian diet. Producer Herb Jordan supported Bey in the resurgence of his recording career, and their 1996 recording Ballads, Blues & Bey returned Bey to prominence.

He has been a longtime-resident of Chelsea, Manhattan.

Awards and honors
 2003: Jazz Vocalist of the Year, Jazz Journalists Association
 2005: Grammy nomination, Best Jazz Vocal Album for American Song
 2014: NPR Music Jazz Critics Poll, Best Vocal Album for Pages from an Imaginary Life

Discography 
 1974: Experience and Judgment (Atlantic)
 1991: As Time Goes By (Jazzette)
 1996: Ballads, Blues & Bey (Evidence)
 1998: Shades of Bey (Evidence)
 2001: Tuesdays in Chinatown (N-Coded)
 2003: Chillin' with Andy Bey (Minor Music)
 2004: American Song (Savoy Jazz)
 2007: Ain't Necessarily So (12th Street)
 2013: The World According to Andy Bey (HighNote)
 2014: Pages from an Imaginary Life (HighNote)

With Andy and the Bey Sisters
 1961: Andy and the Bey Sisters (RCA Victor )
 1964: Now! Hear! (Prestige) with Jerome Richardson, Kenny Burrell
 1965:  'Round Midnight (Prestige) with Kenny Burrell, Milt Hinton, Osie Johnson

With Gary Bartz
 1971: Harlem Bush Music - Taifa (Milestone)
 1971: Harlem Bush Music - Uhuru (Milestone)
 1972: Juju Street Songs (Prestige)
 1973: Follow, the Medicine Man (Prestige)

With Stanley Clarke
 1973: Children of Forever (Polydor)

With Gerry Eastman
 1995: Songbook (Williamsburgh Music Center)

With Howard McGhee Orchestra
 1966: Cookin' Time (Zim)

With Bob Malach
 1995: The Searcher (Go Jazz)

With Grachan Moncur III
 1977 Shadows (Denon)

With Mtume Umoja Ensemble
 1972: Alkebu-Lan: Land of the Blacks (Live at the East)

With Duke Pearson
 1969: How Insensitive (Blue Note)

With Max Roach
 1968: Members, Don't Git Weary (Atlantic)

With Horace Silver
 1970: That Healin' Feelin': The United States Of Mind / Phase 1
 1988: Music to Ease Your Disease (Silveto)
 1993: It's Got to Be Funky (Columbia)
 1996: Total Response (Blue Note)

References

External links 
 Bey's page on La MaMa Archives Digital Collections
 Andy Bey & Andy and the Bey Sisters biography by Alex Henderson, discography and album reviews, credits & releases at AllMusic
 Andy Bey discography, album releases & credits at Discogs

1939 births
Musicians from Newark, New Jersey
Newark Arts High School alumni
People from Chelsea, Manhattan
20th-century American pianists
20th-century American male musicians
21st-century American pianists
21st-century American male musicians
20th-century African-American male singers
American jazz pianists
American jazz singers
American male pianists
American male singers
American gay musicians
LGBT African Americans
LGBT people from New Jersey
Living people
American male jazz musicians
Prestige Records artists
HighNote Records artists
African-American pianists
People with HIV/AIDS
20th-century American LGBT people
21st-century American LGBT people
Jazz musicians from New York (state)
21st-century African-American musicians